The Dauphin is a French sounding rocket, of which six versions were constructed between 1967 and 1978. It represents a modification of the starting stage of the Dragon with a larger payload nosecone.

The Dauphin has a diameter of 56 centimetres, a launch  weight of 1.132 metric tons, a length of 6.21 metres, a takeoff thrust of 90 kN and a ceiling of 150 kilometres. It belonged to a family of solid-propellant rockets including the Belier, the Centaure, and the Dragon, along with the Eridan.

Launching experiments
On September 14, 1972, a Dauphin rocket probed from the Guiana Base of Kourou.

In November 1972, the third launching experiment, a very new and original experiment, took place on a Dauphin Rocket from French Guiana.

References

External links
 Dauphin

Sounding rockets of France